Various Franco-Indian Alliances were formed between France and various Indian kingdoms from the 18th century to the ascent of Napoleon. Following the alliances of Dupleix, a formal alliance was formed between by King Louis XVI during the American Revolutionary War in an attempt to oust the British East India Company from the Indian subcontinent. Later, numerous proposals of alliance were made by Tipu Sultan, leading to the dispatch of a French fleet of volunteers to help him, and even motivating an effort by Napoleon to make a junction with the Kingdom of Mysore through his 1798 campaign in Egypt.

Early French involvement

In the 17th century, François Bernier (1625–1688), a French physician and traveler, became the personal physician of the Mughal emperor Aurangzeb for 12 years.

In the early 18th century, France was actively involved in the powerplay in India. The French General Dupleix was allied to Murzapha Jung in the Deccan, and Chanda Sahib in the Carnatic Wars, in their conflict against Robert Clive of the East India Company. These relationships were beneficial to the French, and French allies gifted areas such as the Alamparai Fort in return for the services provided by the French in conflicts against the British.

The French won a victory in the Battle of Madras in 1746, and the French and Indians fought together and vanquished Anwaruddin in 1749, but failed in the Battle of Arcot in 1751 and finally surrendered in 1752. The French again had a success at the capture of Fort St. David in 1758 under Lally, but were finally defeated at Masulipatam (1759) and Wandewash (1760).

Alliance of Louis XVI

French had lost preeminence in India with the Treaty of Paris in 1763, although five trading posts were being maintained there, leaving opportunities for disputes and power-play with Great Britain. France was successful in supporting the American Revolutionary War in 1776, and wished to oust the British from India as well.

In 1782, Louis XVI sealed an alliance with the Peshwa Madhav Rao Narayan. As a consequence Bussy moved his troops to Île de France (Mauritius) and later contributed to the French effort in India in 1783. Suffren became the ally of Hyder Ali in the Second Anglo-Mysore War in 1782-1783, engaging in five battles against the Royal Navy off the coasts of India and Ceylon.

Between February 1782 and June 1783, Suffren fought with the British admiral Sir Edward Hughes, and collaborated with the rulers of Mysore. Suffren fought in the Battle of Sadras on February 17, 1782, the Battle of Providien on April 12 near Trincomalee, the Battle of Negapatam on July 6 off Cuddalore, after which Suffren seized upon the anchorage of Trincomalee compelling the small British garrison to surrender. An army of 3,000 French soldiers collaborated with Hyder Ali to capture Cuddalore. Finally, the Battle of Trincomalee took place near that port on September 3. These battles can be seen as the last battles of the Franco-British conflict that encompassed the American War of Independence, and would cease with the signature of the Treaty of Versailles of 1783 establishing peace and recognizing American independence.

Proposals of Tipu Sultan

Following the 1783 Treaty of Versailles and the removal of French support, Tipu Sultan, the son of Hyder Ali, was unable to recapture Mangalore from the British, although he later managed to regain control after a 10-month siege in 1784. He finally made peace with the British in spring 1784.

In 1786, Tipu Sultan nevertheless sent an embassy to France through Constantinople, but the embassy had to be cancelled. In July 1787, Tipu Sultan sent a new embassy directly to Paris, formed of three ambassadors Mohammed Dervich Khan, Akbar Ali Khan and Mohammad Osman Khan, who were accompanied by the French trader from Pondicherry, M. Monneron.  After arriving in Toulon, the ambassadors were able to meet with Louis XVI in August 1788 in Versailles. However, France, which was now at peace with London, did not wish to resume hostilities.

Tipu Sultan again proposed an offensive and defensive alliance to France in October 1794, and April 1796. France was hampered in its support to India by the French Revolution, but contacts would resume with the rise of Napoléon.

In 1794, with the support of French Republican officers, Tipu helped found the Jacobin Club of Mysore for 'framing laws comfortable with the laws of the Republic' He planted a Liberty Tree and declared himself Citizen Tipoo.

Napoleon's attempted junction with India
Tipu again made a proposal in October 1797 through Malartic, the Governor of Île de France (Mauritius). Malartic, who could not deplete his forces in Île de France, sent a group of 150 volunteers in the frigate La Preneuse, on 7 March 1798. La Preneuse arrived in Mangalore in April 1798. A group of French officers numbering 124 men, under the Command of Michel Raymond, was also leading an army of 14,000 for the Nizam, Subhadar of the Deccan Ali Khan Asaf Jah II, but following British diplomatic intervention, the Nizam was persuaded to remain neutral in the conflict.

Napoleon Bonaparte, who wished to establish a French presence in the Middle East, took the opportunity of his campaign in Egypt to plan a junction with Tipu against the British. Napoleon assured to the Directoire that "as soon as he had conquered Egypt, he will establish relations with the Indian princes and, together with them, attack the English in their possessions." According to a 13 February 1798 report by Talleyrand: "Having occupied and fortified Egypt, we shall send a force of 15,000 men from Suez to India, to join the forces of Tipu-Sahib and drive away the English." The Directory, though troubled by the scope and cost of the enterprise, agreed so the popular general would be absent from the centre of power.

Napoleon was defeated by a combined Ottoman-British force at the Siege of Acre in 1799, and at the Battle of Abukir in 1801, so that by 1802, France's presence was completely rolled back from the Middle-East. Soon however, from 1803, Napoleon went to great lengths to try to convince the Ottoman Empire to fight against Russia in the Balkans and join his anti-Russian coalition. Napoleon sent General Horace Sebastiani as envoy extraordinary, promising to help the Ottoman Empire recover lost territories. Napoleon also formed a Franco-Persian alliance in 1807 during the Napoleonic Wars, with the continuous aim of having an eventual open path to attack British India.

Napoleon's interest in the Middle East and India waned when he finally vanquished Russia at the Battle of Friedland in July 1807, leading to the Treaty of Tilsit, in December 1807. France as an ally of Russia became a strong repellent to both the Ottoman Empire and Persia. Great Britain signed a mutual defense treaty with Shah Shuja al-Mulk of Afghanistan on 17 June 1809 in order to better resist the Franco-Persian threat, but by that time Persia had already denounced its alliance with France and was moving towards Great Britain. These last events rendered the Franco-Indian alliance impossible to pursue further.

Harohalli French Cemetery
There exists a French cemetery in Harohalli, where the French who came to aid Tipu Sultan are buried. The beautiful cemetery is more than 250 years old, but sadly lies in a state of neglect, with most graves vandalised by the local people. The French soldiers and family members died either by malaria, fatigue or in battle. The land for the French cemetery was granted by Tipu Sultan. Only 35 graves exist at present and most of them in a bad state. The locals have vandalised the graves to remove the iron grills, bricks, metal plaques and expensive marble. Many graves are left without any headstone.

See also
 Foreign alliances of France
 French India
 France–India relations
Jacobin Club of Mysore

Notes

References
 Inari Karsh Empires of the Sand: The Struggle for Mastery in the Middle East, 1789–1923 Harvard University Press, 2001 
 Iradj Amini Napoleon and Persia: Franco-Persian relations under the First Empire Taylor & Francis, 2000 
 Martin Sicker The Islamic world in decline: from the Treaty of Karlowitz to the disintegration of the Ottoman Empire Greenwood Publishing Group, 2001 

Ancien Régime
History of India
France–India relations